Richard Saunders may refer to:

Benjamin Franklin (1706–1790), who used the pseudonym Richard Saunders
Richard Saunders (photographer) (1922–1987), American photographer
Richard Saunders (skeptic) (born 1965), Australian skeptic 
Richard Saunders (anatomist) (1908–1995), South African anatomist
Richard M.K. Saunders, botanist